Olive was launched at Calcutta in 1802. The French captured her in 1806 and the French Navy took her into service under her existing name. She was decommissioned in March 1807.

Career
J. Gilmour & Co. launched Olive at Calcutta on 5 May 1802. In 1803 her master was H. Matthew.

The French frigate  captured Olive on 19 June 1806. Olive was only one of several ships that Sémillante captured on her cruise. 
 
Olive was commissioned on 6 December 1806 at Île de France as a flute. Later, Olive was reported to have been there on 10 January 1807, and to have been captured in the Red Sea. She was decommissioned in March 1807.

Olive apparently returned to British hands and reappeared as a transport at the British invasion of Java (1811).

She then disappeared again from readily available sources.

Notes, citations, and references
Notes

Citations

References
 
 
 

1802 ships
British ships built in India
Age of Sail merchant ships of England
Captured ships
Ships of the French Navy